The Minister for Older People and Equalities is a Junior ministerial post in the Scottish Government. As a result, the Minister does not attend the Scottish Cabinet. The post was created in June 2018: the Minister supports the Cabinet Secretary for Social Security and Older People, who is a full member of cabinet.

Overview 
The Minister for Older People and Equalities has specific responsibility for promoting and coordinating policy in support of:

Social equality with respect to gender, sexuality, race, and disability 
The protection and development of social and human rights
Equality for and the needs of Older people

List of office holders 
The current Minister for Older People and Equalities is Christina McKelvie.

See also
Scottish Parliament

References

External links 
 Minister for Older People and Equalities on Scottish Government website

Older People and Equalities